The Samsung Galaxy A11 is an entry-level Android smartphone developed by Samsung Electronics. It was first announced on March 13, 2020, as a successor to the Samsung Galaxy A10. A similar device, Galaxy M11, was first released in March 2020, but with a larger battery capacity (5000 mAh), also the M11 was being sold in Western Europe officially.

While the Galaxy A01 and Galaxy A11 were skipped in Western Europe, China and South Korea, Samsung released their successors, Galaxy A02s and Galaxy A12.

Design 
The A11 is considerably less compact than its predecessor, measuring 161.4 x 76.3 x 8 mm, and it weighs 177g, 9 grams more than the A10. Looks-wise, the Galaxy A11 looks fairly similar to the Galaxy A10. It has a thin wraparound bezel surrounding the display, with a considerably bigger bottom bezel. Both phones have a fingerprint scanner on the back, and the camera's positioning is on the top-left on both phones. However, the camera array is the biggest design difference between the A10s and A11. While both have their cameras contained in a small vertical oval, the A11 has an extra camera (making said oval bigger vertically), and the flash has been moved to the right of the depth sensor (the top-most camera) rather than below the oval. In addition, the selfie camera's design is different. The A10s had a teardrop notch, while the A11 has a hole-punch in the top-left corner. Also, on the A11, every physical button is on the right side, while on the A10s, the volume buttons were on the left. The A11 comes in four different colors: Black, White, Red and Blue

Specifications

Hardware 
The Samsung Galaxy A11 has a 6.4" PLS TFT display, with a 1560x720 (HD+) resolution. The phone has a 1.8 GHz Octa-core CPU, a Qualcomm Snapdragon 450 SoC, and will come with 32GB of storage (which can be expanded using a microSD card up to 512GB, for a max total of 544GB) and either 2 or 3GB of RAM. The phone has a 4000 mAh battery, and supports 15W fast charging.

Cameras 
Unlike the Galaxy A10, which had only one rear camera, the A11 has three. The specs of the main camera are pretty much the same, save for a slight increase in aperture (f/1.8, up from f/1.9). The A11 also has an ultrawide camera, which will be a 5MP sensor behind an f/2.2 lens. The A11 also has a 2MP, f/2.4 sensor for depth info. The selfie camera received a bump to 8MP (up from 5). From top to bottom, the order of the cameras is depth sensor, main, ultrawide.

Software 
The Galaxy A11 comes with Android 10 under One UI 2 and has recently began receiving the Android 11 and One UI 3 update in certain regions. It will soon get its last software update One UI 4/ Android 12

See also 

 Samsung Galaxy
 Samsung Galaxy A series
 Samsung Galaxy A51

References 

Samsung Galaxy
Mobile phones introduced in 2020
Android (operating system) devices
Samsung mobile phones
Mobile phones with multiple rear cameras